Aizpea Goenaga Mendiola (San Sebastián, Guipúzcoa, Basque Country, 26 November 1959) is a Basque actress and film director. She was the director of Etxepare Basque Institute, the institute of the Basque language and culture between 2009 and 2016. She belongs to a well-known dynasty of Basque actors, Aizpea is the aunt of Bárbara Goenaga, an actress herself, the daughter of the actress Juani Mendiola Barkaiztegi and the sister of the artist Juan Luis Goenaga.

Filmography

As a film actress 
 Obaba (2005)
 Semen, una historia de amor (2005)
  Yoyes (2000)
 Carretera y manta (2000)
 Sí, quiero... (1999)
 Pecata minuta (1999)
 El ataque del hombre mochila (1997)
 Cuestión de suerte (1996)
 Adiós Toby, adiós (1995)
 La gente de la Universal (1991)
 El invierno en Lisboa (1991)
 Santa Cruz, el cura guerrillero (1991)
 Ander eta Yul (1989)

As a television actress 
 Bi eta bat (2012)
 Hospital Central (2004)
 El comisario (2000)
 Teilatupean (2000)
 Goenkale (2000)
 Hermanas (1998)
 Periodistas
 Jaun ta jabe
 Nire familia eta beste animalia batzuk
 Duplex (1993)
 Bi eta bat
 Beni eta Marini
 Hau da A.U.
 Bai Horixe

As a director 
 Sukalde kontuak (2009)
 Zeru Horiek (2006)
 Duplex (1993)

Awards 

 In 2011 she received the Simone de Beauvoir Prize from the Exhibition of Film Created by Women.

References

External links 

 
 Official Website of the Etxepare Basque Institute

1959 births
Living people
Actresses from the Basque Country (autonomous community)
Film directors from the Basque Country (autonomous community)
Spanish women film directors
People from San Sebastián
Basque-language actors